Brian Humphrey Lucas  (born 20 January 1940) is a British Anglican priest and retired military chaplain. From 1991 to 1995, he served as Chaplain-in-Chief, and thereby head of the Royal Air Force Chaplains Branch, and Archdeacon for the Royal Air Force.

Lucas was educated at St David's College, Lampeter (BA 1962); and St Stephen's House, Oxford. After ordination in 1964, he served on the staff of Llandaff Cathedral until 1967 when he moved to the parish of Neath. He was commissioned as a chaplain in the RAF in 1970. After chaplaincies in Cornwall, Malta and East Anglia, he was Staff Chaplain to the Chaplain-in-Chief at MOD from 1979 until 1982. Following a tour in Cyprus, he became the Senior Chaplain at the RAF College Cranwell in 1985.  He was appointed Assistant Chaplain-in-Chief and Command Chaplain RAF Germany from 1987 until 1989 when he became Assistant Chaplain-in-Chief and Command Chaplain RAF Support Command. He was an Honorary Chaplain to Her Majesty the Queen from 1989 to 1995. In January 1993 he was made a Companion of the Order of the Bath. He was Canon of Lincoln from 1991 (Emeritus from 2003). He was appointed Chaplain-in-Chief and Archdeacon to the RAF in 1991 (Emeritus from 1996). He was Rector of the Caythorpe Benefice comprising the parishes of Caythorpe, Fulbeck and Carlton Scroop with Normanton, in the Diocese of Lincoln from 1996 to 2003. In 2011 he published his autobiography ("Reflections in a Chalice"), and in 2014 and 2017 two volumes on the great Gothic Cathedrals of France ("A Glimpse of Glory"). In 2020 he published a book of his selected sermons, ("Alive in Christ").

References

1940 births
Living people
20th-century English Anglican priests
21st-century English Anglican priests
Royal Air Force Chaplains-in-Chief
Alumni of St Stephen's House, Oxford
Alumni of the University of Oxford
Alumni of the University of Wales, Lampeter
Honorary Chaplains to the Queen
Companions of the Order of the Bath
People from Caythorpe, Lincolnshire